The Ireland Davis Cup team represents the whole of the island of Ireland in Davis Cup tennis competition and are governed by Tennis Ireland. Ireland competed in its first Davis Cup in 1923.

Ireland currently compete in the Europe Zone of Group IV, having been promoted from Group III in 2017.  They competed in the World Group in 1983, and also reached the semifinals of the Europe Zone in 1936.

In common with the Olympics, players from Northern Ireland may also opt to represent Great Britain.

Current squad
Player information and rankings

Recent performances

2000s

2010s

Statistics
Most matches played (win-loss):
 Sean Sorensen  54 (28-26)
 Owen Casey     49 (33-16)
 George Lyttleton-Rogers 49 (24-25)
 Matt Doyle     44 (27-17)
 Michael Hickey 40 (13-27)
 Eoin Collins   33 (16-17)
 Peter Jackson  33 (09-24)
 Scott Barron   30 (17-13)
 Guy Jackson    30 (13-17)
 Conor Niland   29 (17-12)
Most wins:
 Owen Casey     33
 Sean Sorensen  28
 Matt Doyle     27
 George Lyttleton-Rogers 24
 Conor Niland   17
 Scott Barron   17
 Peter Wright   16
 Eoin Collins   16
 Jonathan Simpson 15
 John Doran     13
 Michael Hickey 13
 Guy Jackson    13
 Kevin Sorensen 12
 Louk Sorensen  10
Most singles wins:
 Owen Casey    21
 Sean Sorensen 19
 Matt Doyle    19
 George Lyttleton-Rogers 18
 Conor Niland  14
 Scott Barron  11
 Louk Sorensen 10
 Guy Jackson    9
 John Doran     8
 Eoin Collins   8
 Kevin Sorensen  7
 Peter Jackson  7
Most doubles wins:
 Owen Casey     12
 Sean Sorensen   9
 Peter Wright    8
 Eoin Collins    8
 Matt Doyle      8
 Michael Hickey  7
 Scott Barron    6
 George Lyttleton-Rogers 6
 Kevin Sorensen   5
 John Doran      5

See also
 Davis Cup
 Ireland Fed Cup team
 Tennis Ireland

External links

 http://www.tennisireland.ie/

Davis Cup teams
Davis Cup
Davis Cup